Fran Curci (born June 11, 1938) is a former American football player and coach. He was an All-American quarterback at the University of Miami in 1959. He served as head coach at the University of Tampa from 1968 to 1970, the University of Miami from 1971 to 1972 and the University of Kentucky from 1973 to 1981, compiling a career college football coaching record of 81–70–2.

Coaching career
Curci led the University of Tampa Spartans to a 25–6 record in three seasons (1968–1970). After his team defeated the Miami Hurricanes at the Orange Bowl in 1970, and Tampa finished that season 10–1, he was hired by the University of Miami.

Curci's record at Miami was 9–13. He was head coach at Miami during the infamous Florida Flop in 1971 when the Florida Gators defense allowed Miami to score a touchdown late in the fourth quarter by dropping to the ground mid-play. The defense wanted quarterback John Reaves to get the ball back and set an NCAA career passing record. Florida won the game 45–16. Curci was particularly upset at the Gators' actions since the game was well out of reach by then. He refused to shake hands with Florida coach Doug Dickey after the game, and was quoted as saying, "I lost all respect for [Dickey] as a coach and as a man. What he did shows no class... I think he made a fool of himself."

During his tenure at the University of Kentucky, Curci compiled a record of 47–51–2. The 1976 Kentucky Wildcats finished 9–3 and 5–1 in conference play—their first winning season in 13 years—and defeated North Carolina in the Peach Bowl 21–0, finishing ranked #18 in the final Associated Press poll. After that season, the Wildcats were slapped with two years' probation for numerous recruiting and amateurism violations. The Wildcats were also banned from bowl games and live television in 1977, and limited to only 25 scholarships in 1977 and 1978.
The 1977 team finished 10–1, including a win at #4 Penn State and an undefeated record in conference play though they were ineligible for the title due to probation. They finished the season ranked #6 in the final Associated Press poll. It was only the second 10-win season in school history.

Due in part to the loss of scholarships from the 1976 infractions case, Curci was never able to put together another winning team. In his last four years, he only won eight games in SEC play. Curci's tenure as Kentucky's coach ended after nine seasons, then the longest of any Kentucky coach (but since surpassed by Mark Stoops). In his final game as Kentucky's coach, Curci led the Wildcats to a 21–10 victory over Tennessee on November 21, 1981.

Curci later coached in the Arena Football League with the Tampa Bay Storm in 1991, and the Cincinnati Rockers in 1992. He led the Storm, quarterbacked by future Washington Redskins head coach Jay Gruden, to an ArenaBowl V championship and was named Coach of the Year in his only season with Tampa Bay. Curci also did radio broadcasts for Tampa Bay Buccaneers and college football games.

Late life
After leaving coaching, Curci served as Parks Commissioner for the Commonwealth of Kentucky.

Head coaching record

College

‡ Ineligible for SEC title, bowl game and Coaches Poll

References

1938 births
Living people
American football quarterbacks
College football announcers
Arena Football League coaches
Kentucky Wildcats football coaches
National Football League announcers
Miami Hurricanes football coaches
Miami Hurricanes football players
Tampa Bay Buccaneers announcers
Tampa Bay Storm coaches
Tampa Spartans athletic directors
Tampa Spartans football coaches
NCAA sanctions
Sportspeople from Pittsburgh
Players of American football from Florida
Players of American football from Pittsburgh